Hematodinium perezi is an internal dinoflagellate parasite that infects crustaceans, including blue crabs, and causes bitter crab disease. Other crustaceans that have been observed to be infected include the Norway Lobster and King Crab, and has been observed to have a significant impact on crustacean fisheries. Infected crabs frequently show signs of weakness and lethargy, and often die due to stress-related handling from fishing as well as metabolic exhaustion due to reduced feeding. This parasite is known to be transmitted between alternate crustacean hosts, through the sharing of water and with the feeding of crabs on infected crabs.

H. perezi is a type species of the genus Hematodinium, and H. perezi has only recently been identified as the specific parasitic dinoflagellate infecting crustaceans. In the east coast of the United States, the disease is most prevalent in the autumn months when the species blooms off the Mid-Atlantic coast. Infected crabs have been observed to have mortality rates as high as 86 percent after only a few weeks, and infection is found to be more prevalent in higher salinity waters towards the mouth of the bay where Callinectes go to spawn, generally 12 PSU and up.

Further reading 

Species described in 1931
Dinophyceae
Parasitic alveolates
Diseases and parasites of crustaceans